Takes a Little Time may refer to:
"Takes a Little Time" (Amy Grant song)
"Takes a Little Time" (Total Contrast song)

See also
"Take a Little Time", a song by Jeremy Camp from Beyond Measure